Kaseni may refer to:
 Kaseni, Lumbini in Palpa District in Nepal
 Kaseni, Kosi in Morang District in Nepal